Corporate manslaughter is a crime in several jurisdictions, including England and Wales and Hong Kong. It enables a corporation to be punished and censured for culpable conduct that leads to a person's death. This extends beyond any compensation that might be awarded in civil litigation or any criminal prosecution of an individual (including an employee or contractor). The Corporate Manslaughter and Corporate Homicide Act 2007 came into effect in the UK on 6 April 2008.

Theory
Clarkson identifies six theories of corporate manslaughter:
Identification doctrine;
Aggregation doctrine;
Reactive corporate fault;
Vicarious liability; 
Management failure model; and
Corporate mens rea.

Identification doctrine
This approach holds that the offence of corporate manslaughter is made out when an individual commits all the elements of the offence of manslaughter and that person is sufficiently senior to be seen as the controlling mind of the corporation. Prior to the Corporate Manslaughter and Corporate Homicide Act 2007, this is how the law applied in England and Wales.

Aggregation doctrine
This approach, known in the U.S. as the collective knowledge doctrine, aggregates all the acts and mental elements of various company employees and finds the offence if all the elements of manslaughter are made out, though not necessarily within a single controlling mind. This approach is used in the U.S. but has been rejected in England and Wales.

Reactive corporate fault
This idea was proposed by Fisse and Braithwaite. They proposed that where an individual had committed the actus reus of manslaughter, a court should have the power to order the employing corporation to institute measures to prevent further recurrence and should face criminal prosecution should they fail to do so.

Vicarious liability
The broader principle of vicarious liability (respondeat superior in the U.S.) is often invoked to establish corporate manslaughter. In the U.S., where an employee commits a crime within the sphere of his employment and with the intention of benefitting the corporation, his criminality can be imputed to the company. The principle has sometimes been used in England and Wales for strict liability offences concerning regulatory matters but the exact law is unclear.

Management failure model
This is the approach to be taken under the Corporate Manslaughter and Corporate Homicide Act 2007 which came into force in the UK in April 2008. Where a corporation's activities cause a person's death and the failure was because of a breach that falls far below what can reasonably be expected of the organisation in the circumstances, the offence is made out.

Corporate mens rea
A further approach is to accept the legal fiction of corporate personality and to extend it to the possibility of a corporate mens rea, to be found in corporate practices and policies. This approach has been widely advocated in the U.S., as the corporate ethos standard and introduced in Australia in 1995.

Support and criticism of the concept
Clarkson identifies four valuable characteristics of criminal prosecution:
Stronger procedural protection of corporations, such as proof beyond reasonable doubt;
More powerful enforcement agencies, such as the Health and Safety Executive in the UK;
The stigma and censure that follow from conviction; and
The symbolic role of criminal law that "sends a message" to society.

However, the existence of such a crime has been criticised, especially from the point of view of law and economics which argues that civil damages are a more appropriate means of compensation, recognition of the loss suffered and deterrence. Such arguments emphasise that, because the civil courts award compensation commensurate with the damage done, they apply the appropriate level of deterrence.

Again, such arguments contend that "over-deterrence" may divert resources from other socially beneficial activities.

A further strand of criticism holds that only individuals can commit crimes. Further, it is individuals who feel the threat of deterrence. In England in 1994, OLL Ltd. were convicted of corporate manslaughter over the Lyme Bay kayaking tragedy and fined £60,000 while Peter Kite, one of the company's directors, was sentenced to three years' imprisonment, arguably a greater influence on the conduct of company managers. 
Further, a corporation may simply be a "veil" for an individual's activities, easily liquidated and with no reputation to protect. Again it is argued, company fines ultimately punish shareholders, customers and employees in general, rather than culpable managers.

By jurisdiction

United Kingdom
Corporate manslaughter (England and Wales)

Australia
The Australian Capital Territory, Queensland, the Northern Territory and Victoria recognise the crime of Industrial manslaughter.

Canada
In Canada, Bill C-45 was enacted as a response to the Westray Mine explosion that killed twenty-six miners in 1992. The Bill added a new section to the Canadian Criminal Code ("217.1 Every one who undertakes, or has the authority, to direct how another person does work or performs a task is under a legal duty to take reasonable steps to prevent bodily harm to that person, or any other person, arising from that work or task.") and adds sections 22.1 and 22.2 to the Criminal Code to impose criminal liability on organizations for negligence (s. 22.1) and other offences (s. 22.2).

New Zealand
In 2012, proposals were put forward in the New Zealand Parliament for a corporate manslaughter statute, in the wake of the CTV building collapse during the 2011 Canterbury earthquake, and the Pike River Mine disaster. As of March 2015 Labour Party leader Andrew Little had a private member's bill in the ballot that would, if passed, add a charge of corporate manslaughter to the Crimes Act 1961.

United States 
In the U.S. there is currently no corporate manslaughter law. However, there have been numerous calls in the literature for a "corporate death penalty". Most recently a study argued that industries that kill more people each year than they employ should have an industry-wide corporate death penalty.

See also 
 Corporate crime
 Judicial dissolution
 Capital punishment

References

Bibliography

Corporate crime
Killings by type